Decock is a surname. Notable people with the surname include:

 Pierre Decock (born 1959), Luxembourgian historian, writer, illustrator, and financial advisor
 Roger Decock (1927–2020), Belgian cyclist
 Yvan Decock (born 1941), Belgian sprint canoeist

See also
 Decocker